The women's 3000 metres event  at the 1986 European Athletics Indoor Championships was held on 23 February.

Results

References

3000 metres at the European Athletics Indoor Championships
3000
Euro